Orianna Moon Andrews (18341883) was an American doctor who was one of the first women in America to hold a medical degree. She served as a doctor for the Confederate Army during the American Civil War.

Career
Born in 1834 in Albemarle County, Virginia to a plantation owning family, Orianna Andrews (nee Moon) decided to study medicine from an early age. She attended the Troy Female Seminary (now the Emma Willard School) for a year which provided the required courses in sciences and mathematics to allow her to go onto the Female Medical College of Pennsylvania (now the Woman's Medical College of Pennsylvania). This was in the College's fourth induction of students, and Andrews was the first woman from Virginia to attend and only the third woman from the Southern United States.

Her thesis was submitted in 1856, with graduation taking place the following year. At the time, she was one of 38 women who had received medical degrees in the United States. She spent two years travelling in the Middle East and Europe, before returning to North America in 1861 towards the start of the American Civil War. She wrote to the military commanders of Virginia, offering her skills to the war effort of the Confederate States of America.

She was employed as the superintendent of a team of nurses in a makeshift hospital at the University of Virginia. She wrote to Brigadier General Philip St. George Cocke asking to be moved to the front, and her sister Lottie Moon wrote to him in support as well. She was not moved but instead left the service when she married Dr. John Summerfield Andrews in November 1861. They moved to Richmond, Virginia and worked in a Confederate Army hospital. She went back to Albemarle County to give birth to her first son in the following year.

They moved to Tennessee after the war, but returned to Albemarle County following an altercation with the Ku Klux Klan. Back in the county of her birth, the couple set up a joint medical practice. Andrews died of cancer in 1883. By the time of her death, the couple had six sons, although a further six children had died in childhood.

References

1834 births
1883 deaths
People from Albemarle County, Virginia
Physicians from Virginia
Woman's Medical College of Pennsylvania alumni
People of Virginia in the American Civil War
Deaths from cancer in Virginia
19th-century American women physicians
19th-century American physicians
Emma Willard School alumni